Sergio Rodríguez Viera (4 April 1928 – 6 April 1986) was a Uruguayan footballer who played as a forward, and football manager.

Playing career
Rodríguez played for the Uruguayan Primera División, French Ligue 1, and Spanish La Liga. After good seasons with Rampla Juniors played two seasons with the Stade Français which struggled to avoid relegation. In three seasons with CD Málaga where he scored goals, he signed for Real Madrid C.F. In Madrid played 5 league games. In the 1954–55 season he joined to Hércules CF where he spent 4 seasons at a good level. He was in Hércules where he started as player–manager on an interim basis. He later played on the third level with Alicante CF and Orihuela Deportiva CF, where he also served as player-coach these teams.

Coaching career
Then began a coaching career that led him to spend practically all categories of Spanish football. In the 1968–69 season reached promotion to RCD Mallorca in La Liga.

Personal
Rodríguez' brother, Héctor Rodríguez Viera, was also a footballer, in teams as Club Nacional de Football.

References

External links
 
 

1928 births
1986 deaths
People from Colonia del Sacramento
Uruguayan footballers
Association football forwards
Ligue 1 players
La Liga players
Segunda División players
Uruguayan expatriate footballers
Expatriate footballers in France
Expatriate footballers in Spain
Rampla Juniors players
Stade Français (association football) players
Real Madrid CF players
CD Málaga footballers
Hércules CF players
Alicante CF footballers
Orihuela Deportiva CF footballers
Uruguayan football managers
Expatriate football managers in Spain
La Liga managers
Hércules CF managers
Alicante CF managers
RCD Mallorca managers
Caravaca CF managers